Long Lake Township is a civil township in Burleigh County in the U.S. state of North Dakota. As of the 2010 census, its population was 103.

References

Townships in Burleigh County, North Dakota
Townships in North Dakota